In biology, juxtacrine signalling (or contact-dependent signalling) is a type of cell–cell or cell–extracellular matrix signalling in multicellular organisms that requires close contact. In this type of signalling, a ligand on one surface binds to a receptor on another adjacent surface. Hence, this stands in contrast to releasing a signaling molecule by diffusion into extracellular space, the use of long-range conduits like membrane nanotubes and cytonemes (akin to 'bridges') or the use of extracellular vesicles like exosomes or microvesicles (akin to 'boats'). There are three types of juxtacrine signaling:
 A membrane ligand (protein, oligosaccharide, lipid) and a membrane protein of two adjacent cells interact.
 A communicating junction links the intracellular compartments of two adjacent cells, allowing transit of relatively small molecules.
 An extracellular matrix glycoprotein and a membrane protein interact.
Additionally, in unicellular organisms such as bacteria, juxtacrine signaling refers to interactions by membrane contact.

Juxtacrine signaling has been observed for some growth factors, cytokine and chemokine cellular signals, playing an important role in the immune response. It has a critical role in development, particularly of cardiac and neural function. Other types of cell signaling include paracrine signalling and autocrine signalling. Paracrine signaling occurs over short distances, while autocrine signaling involves a cell responding to its own paracrine factors.

The term "juxtacrine" was originally introduced by Anklesaria et al. (1990) to describe a possible way of signal transduction between TGF alpha and EGFR.

Cell–cell signaling
In this type of signaling, a cell places a specific ligand on the surface of its membrane, and subsequently another cell can bind it with an appropriate cell surface receptor or cell adhesion molecule. An important example is the Notch signaling pathway, notably involved in neural development. In the Notch signaling pathway for vertebrates and Drosophila, the receiving cell is told not to become neural through the binding of Delta and Notch. Within the eye of vertebrates, which cells become optic neurons and which become glial cells is regulated by Notch and its ligands.

Communicating junctions
Two adjacent cells can construct communicating conduits between their intracellular compartments: gap junctions in animals and plasmodesmas in plants.

Gap junctions are made of connexins in vertebrates and innexins in invertebrates. Electrical synapses are electrically conductive gap junctions between neurons. Gap junctions are critical for cardiac myocytes; mice and humans deficient in a particular gap junction protein have severe heart development defects.

Plasmodesmas in plants are cytoplasmic strands that pass through cell walls and facilitate connections with adjacent cells. Plasmodesmas are highly dynamic in both strucutural modifications and biogenesis. They are able to organize cells in domains, serving as basic developmental units for plants, as well as mediate the intracellular movement of a variety of proteins and nucleic acids.

Cell–extracellular matrix signaling 
The extracellular matrix is composed of glycoproteins (proteins and mucopolysaccharides (glycosaminoglycan)) produced by the organism's cells. They are secreted not only to build a supportive structure but also to provide critical information on the immediate environment to nearby cells. Indeed, the cells can themselves interact by contact with extracellular matrix molecules and as such, this can be considered an indirect cell / cell communication. Cells use mainly the receptor integrin to interact with ECM proteins. Integrins are a family of receptor proteins that integrate the extracellular and intracellular structures, allowing them to perform together. This signaling can influence the cell cycle and cellular differentiation by directing which cells live or die, which cells proliferate, or which cells are able to exit the cell cycle and differentiate. Cellular differentiation involves a cell changing its phenotypical or functional type.

See also
 Cell adhesion, mechanical adhesion between cells and/or the extracellular matrix
 Role of cell adhesions in neural development
 Cell adhesion molecules
 Pannexin, vertebrate proteins used to form conduits between the intracellular and extracellular space
 Autocrine signalling
 Paracrine signalling
 Endocrine system

References

External links
 "Autocrine versus juxtacrine signaling modes" - illustration at sysbio.org

Cell signaling